Suphisellus bruchi is a species of burrowing water beetle in the subfamily Noterinae. It was described by Zimmermann in 1919 and is found in Argentina and Brazil.

References

Suphisellus
Beetles described in 1919